The 2013 Liga Indonesia First Division season is the eighteenth edition of Liga Indonesia First Division since its establishment in 1995. The competition is managed by PT. Liga Indonesia (LI).

Perseka Kaimana is the last season champion version BLAI and Persibangga Purbalingga for LPIS version.

The competition starts on 16 June 2013 and scheduled to finish by September 2013.

 PS Kwarta Deli Serdang to win the title after defeating Persinga Ngawi with the score 1–0 in the final.

Format
As with previous seasons, the competition system used in the First Division this season is a home tournament with a round robin format. League is divided into three groups stage and knock-out round. In the first stage of the club is divided into 12 groups, group winner and runner-up advances to second stage. While the second stage is divided into four groups of six, the winner and runner-up of each group advances to third stage and also promotion to 2014 Premier Division season. In the third round the eight teams that qualify from the second round were divided into two groups of four, while the knockout consist of finals.

Teams

First round
In this stage 77 teams divided into twelve group (seven group of six and five group of seven). All result for this stage is not complete.

Source: First Division 1st round table

Second round
In this stage 24 teams divided into four group of six. This stage scheduled start from 14 to 29 September 2013. Results in the table below are not exhaustive, but the team with the green background has qualified for the third round.

Source:First Division 2nd round table

Third round
In this stage 8 teams divided into two group of four. This stage scheduled start from 9 to 14 November 2013. Winners of each group advance to the finals to compete for the First Division title.

Source:First Division 3rd round table

All games played at the Ciamis Regency.

All games played at the Lebak Bulus Stadium, Jakarta.

Final

Champions

References

Liga Indonesia First Division seasons
3